Kadathukaran is a 1965 Indian Malayalam film,  directed by M. Krishnan Nair and produced by A. K. Balasubrahmaniam. The film stars Sathyan, Sheela, Adoor Bhasi and Hari in the lead roles. The film had musical score by M. S. Baburaj.

Cast

Sathyan as Ramu
Sheela as Madhuri
Adoor Bhasi as Kala Velu
Hari as Chandran
Prem Nawas as SI Mukundan
Adoor Pankajam as Naaniyamma
Ambika as Thankamma
Baby Vinodini as Leela
G. K. Pillai as Rajan
Haji Abdul Rahman as Chandi
Kottayam Chellappan as DYSP Ramadas
Paravoor Bharathan as Bhadran
Sujatha as Kadambari
Suprabha as Chandrika

Soundtrack
The music was composed by M. S. Baburaj and the lyrics were written by Vayalar Ramavarma.

References

External links
 

1965 films
1960s Malayalam-language films
Films directed by M. Krishnan Nair